The Sullenberger Aviation Museum formerly the Carolinas Aviation Museum, is an aviation museum on the grounds of Charlotte Douglas International Airport in Charlotte, North Carolina.

It is one of a few aviation museums located at an airport which serves as a major hub (Charlotte is the #2 hub for American Airlines).  Its centerpiece attraction is the Airbus A320 used on US Airways Flight 1549.

Overview
The museum was founded in 1992 by Floyd and Lois Peithman Wilson, and has a collection of over 50 static aircraft and many smaller historic items related to aviation in North Carolina and South Carolina. Most of the collection consists of Cold War military aircraft, including several historic jet aircraft from the 1950s and 1960s. Several aircraft came from the closed Florence Air & Missile Museum, in Florence, South Carolina. A significant number of aircraft have also come from Marine Corps Air Station Cherry Point and Marine Corps Air Station New River. The museum no longer operates flying aircraft, however, due to its location on Charlotte-Douglas International Airport property, it has on occasion hosted historic aircraft for fly-ins. Those aircraft include the B-17, B-24, B-29 and Berlin Airlift C-54.

Until April 2010, the museum was located in the airport's original 1932 hangar, built by the Works Progress Administration. The museum moved into a new facility at the Charlotte-Douglas International Airport at 4672 First Flight Drive. The new facility enabled the majority of the aircraft to be inside a climate-controlled facility and allowed for new displays.

In October 2012, the museum became a Smithsonian affiliate.

In July 2019, the museum closed to the public and all aircraft were moved into temporary storage in preparation for the new facility. The museum is currently working to develop plans for a new location with a planned re-opening in 2022. In June 2021, the museum announced plans to reopen with a new main gallery and welcome center adjacent to the original 1932 hangar.

The museum announced on January 14, 2022 that it would be named for Chesley B. "Sully" Sullenberger. In 2023, the museum will house a permanent Miracle on the Hudson exhibit. Also, the museum announced a $1 million gift from Red Ventures CEO Ric Elias, who survived the flight, and a $500,000 gift from Lonely Planet. The museum broke ground on its new facility in September 2022.

Collections and aircraft

The museum's collections include:
 Major Dolph D. Overton III USAF
 Piedmont Airlines Historical Society
 Preddy Memorial Foundation (World War II, Preddy Brothers artifacts)
The Chesley B. "Sully" Sullenberger collection, acquired by the museum in August 2018. This collection includes letters and items given to Captain Sullenberger after the successful emergency water landing of U.S. Airways Flight 1549 in January 2009.

Aircraft in collection

 Airbus A320-214 c/n 1044 N106US – "Miracle on the Hudson" aircraft
 Beechcraft T-34 Mentor – On loan from the National Museum of the Marine Corps.
 Bell AH-1 Cobra – On loan from National Museum of the Marine Corps.
 Bell UH-1 Iroquois
 Bellanca 14-9L Crusair c/n 1037 / N1KQ
 Ercoupe 415-C c/n 3805 / N3180H
 Long/Schweizer Midget Mustang c/n 100001
 Boeing KC-97 Stratofreighter Serial 53-0335 – (Cockpit Only)
 Boeing N2S Kaydet BuNo 15923 / N48272 – United States Navy
 Boeing Vertol CH-46D Sea Knight BuNo 153389 USMC – Medal of Honor Winner Vietnam War
 Cessna 150 L Serial 15074276 N19253 –
 Convair YF-102 Delta Dagger 53-1788
 Douglas DC-3 N44V (Piedmont Airlines markings) – Former C-47
 Douglas A-26C Invader Serial 44-35752 – (Storage)
 Douglas D-558-1 Skystreak BuNo 37972 – This was third Skystreak of three, last flown by Scott Crossfield
 Douglas A4D-1 Skyhawk BuNo 142226 – US Marines 156th of 2960 built
 Douglas DC-7B N836D (Eastern Airlines) – Flyable
 Grumman Gulfstream II Serial 001 / N55RG (Arrived September 2012)
 Grumman OV-1D Mohawk Serial 62-5890
 Grumman OV-1D Mohawk Serial 62-5874
 Grumman F-14D Super Tomcat BuNo 161166
 Kaman HOK-1 BuNo 139990
 LTV A-7E Corsair II BuNo 159971, Desert Storm, USS John F. Kennedy
 Lockheed EC-130E Hercules 62–1857, United States Air Force, Vietnam, Operation Eagle Claw, Grenada, Desert Shield, Desert Storm & Bosnia
 Lockheed TV-1/P-80 (#1) Shooting Star BuNo 33866
 Lockheed P-80 (#2) – (In Storage)
 Lockheed TV-2/T-33 (#3) Shooting Star Ser ?? – (In Storage)
 Lockheed TV-2/T-33 (#4) Shooting Star Ser ?? – (#2 In Storage)
 McDonnell Douglas AV-8B Harrier II BuNo 161397 – United States Marines, #3 U.S. Built Harrier / #2 Flight test aircraft - 5000+ hrs of test flight time.
 McDonnell Douglas F-4S Phantom II BuNo 155872
 McDonnell Douglas F-4S Phantom II BuNo 158353 – (Cockpit Only)
 McDonnell Douglas F-101B Voodoo Serial 56-0243
 North American T-28B Trojan BuNo 138258 – United States Army
 North American T-2A Buckeye BuNo 148239
 North American F-86L Sabre Serial 52-4159 – (In Storage)
 North American F-100F Super Sabre Serial ?? – (In Storage)
 North American F-100D Super Sabre Serial ?? – (Storage)
 Republic F-84G Thunderjet Serial 53-3253 – Donated by Charlotte Aircraft Corporation
 Savoia-Marchetti S.56 Serial 07 – On Loan from the Reynolda House Museum of American Art
 Sikorsky HH-3 USAF Jolly Green Giant – On Loan from the National Museum of the United States Air Force
 Sikorsky S-51 Dragon Fly – On Loan from the National Museum of the Marine Corps.
 Sikorsky CH-53A Sea Stallion – Loan from the National Museum of the Marine Corps - came from Pax River and Quantico
 Sopwith Camel – Replica
 Wright brothers 1902 Wright Glider (Reproduction) – On Display at Charlotte-Douglas Airport
 Wright brothers 1903 Wright Flyer (Reproduction) – On display in main museum
 Waco CG-15 – United States Army Air Forces - In Storage recovered from South Carolina

US Airways Heritage Collection

The museum holds a large collection of artifacts and memorabilia from various legacy airlines which merged into the now-defunct US Airways. The museum's special collections and archival material are currently in storage and inaccessible for research.

The collection includes artifacts from:

Allegheny Airlines
America West
Mohawk Airlines
Piedmont Airlines
Pacific Southwest Airlines (PSA)
Other legacy carriers

Acquisition of US Airways Flight 1549 Airbus 

On January 15, 2009, US Airways Flight 1549 took off from New York's LaGuardia Airport for a flight to Charlotte, North Carolina, when  multiple bird strikes a few minutes after takeoff forced a ditching in the Hudson River. The ditching and subsequent rescue operations were accomplished without loss of life. The aircraft, an A320-214, was eventually recovered from the river.

In January 2011, the Carolinas Aviation Museum acquired the entire airframe from the insurance company, AIG, who donated the aircraft to the museum. The airframe was transported by road from its storage location at J Supor & Son Trucking & Rigging Co. Inc. in Kearny, New Jersey to the museum at Charlotte Douglas International Airport in Charlotte. The transportation took 7 days, between June 4 and 10, 2011, and covered 788 miles through New Jersey, Delaware, Maryland, West Virginia, Virginia & North Carolina. Because the fuselage was transported in one piece, as it was when it was recovered from the river, the truck was 190 feet long. Virtually everything except the passengers' personal belongings are still in the airplane. The landing gear pins, fire axe, and the manuals were still in the cockpit, and the Coke cans were still in the beverage carts.

The airframe has been reassembled and was on display from 2011 to 2019 in the same configuration as it was when it was pulled out of the Hudson River in January 2009. The airframe is being conserved as opposed to restored with dents from the birds and tugboat. In addition to the airframe, Captain Sullenberger and First Officer Skiles have contributed their uniforms to the museum's 1549 exhibit.

The aircraft arrived in June 2011, and reassembly of the main components took about one year. The engines arrived in May 2012 and were planned to be reassembled in time for the fourth anniversary of the landing in the Hudson (January 15, 2013). The museum opened a major new exhibit surrounding Flight 1549 with artifacts such as Captain Sullenberger's uniform in August 2012.

The aircraft is currently in storage as the museum designs a new facility, set to open in 2023.

See also
List of aerospace museums
Myrtle Beach Air Force Base

References

External links

 Video about the move of the airplane (June 2011)

Aerospace museums in North Carolina
Museums in Charlotte, North Carolina
Museums established in 1992
1992 establishments in North Carolina